HMS Virago was a B-class torpedo boat destroyer of the British Royal Navy. She was completed by Laird Brothers, Birkenhead, in 1897.  One of four Quail-class destroyers she served during the Great War and was sold off after hostilities ended.

Construction and design
HMS Virago was laid down as Yard number 609 at Laird's shipyard at Birkenhead on 13 June 1895, the fourth "Thirty-Knotter" destroyer ordered from Lairds for the Royal Navy as part of the 1894–95 shipbuilding programme. Virago was completed in June 1897.

Armament was a QF 12 pounder 12 cwt ( calibre), with a secondary armament of five 6-pounder guns, and two 18-inch (450 mm) torpedo tubes. As with other early Royal Navy destroyers, the detailed design was left to the builder, with the Admiralty laying down only broad requirements.

Displacement was  light and  full load, while crew was 63.

Service history
On 26 June 1897, the newly completed Virago took part in the naval review at Spithead to celebrate the Golden Jubilee of Queen Victoria. The Laird-built torpedo boat destroyers were considered well suited to overseas deployment, being good sea boats and having adequate stability for making long oceanic journeys to their stations, and so Virago was posted, along with sister ship  to the Pacific Station, based at Esquimalt in British Columbia, Canada. In 1903, Virago was transferred to the China Station.

On 30 August 1912 the Admiralty directed all destroyers were to be grouped into classes designated by letters based on contract speed and appearance. As a four-funneled 30-knotter destroyer, Virago was assigned to the B class.

Virago was still listed as part of the China Squadron in December 1913, but in January 1914, she was listed for sale at Hong Kong. The outbreak of the First World War ended these  plans, however, and Virago was re-commissioned at Hong Kong on 15 August 1914. Virago was paid off in preparation for sale on 10 May 1919, and was sold for scrap on 10 October that year.

References

Bibliography

External links
 HMS VIRAGO - August 1914 to July 1915, August 1917 to May 1919, China Station Logbooks as part of Old Weather Project

 

Quail-class destroyers
Ships built on the River Mersey
1895 ships
B-class destroyers (1913)
World War I destroyers of the United Kingdom